The Manchester Storm are a British professional ice hockey team founded in 2015. They are members of the Elite Ice Hockey League and are based at Planet Ice in Altrincham, Greater Manchester.

History
The original Manchester Storm team were founded in 1995 and were owned by the operators of the newly-opened Manchester Arena. The Storm won the First Division championship in their inaugural season, before becoming a founding member of the Ice Hockey Superleague in 1996. The Storm won the league championship in the 1998–99 season, before capturing the Autumn Cup the following season. The Storm drew many large crowds, breaking the British attendance record for a match against the Sheffield Steelers during the 1996–97 season. Manchester Storm was sold to Manchester businessman Gary Cowan who against all odds kept the team going until the league itself was closed following Sky Tv pulling out from its obligation to show live games.
The original Storm were forced to close in 2002 after financial problems, along with other members of the league.

The Manchester Phoenix were formed in 2003. They were founder members of the Elite Ice Hockey League (EIHL), but moved to the English Premier League in 2009 due to financial reasons. Initially playing out of the Manchester Arena, the Phoenix would eventually relocate to the Altrincham Ice Dome.

At the end of the 2014–15 season, a legal dispute arose between the management of the Altrincham Ice Dome and the Phoenix team over alleged financial impropriety regarding junior teams at the venue. Around the same time, the Hull Stingrays of the Elite Ice Hockey League withdrew from the EIHL. The management of the Altrincham Ice Dome and the EIHL subsequently reached an agreement to place a team in Altrincham to fill the gap created by Hull's liquidation. This team was to be the new Manchester Storm.

First season (2015–16)

On 26 June 2015, the Storm announced their first two pre-season games against the Nottingham Panthers and old rivals the Sheffield Steelers. Owner Mark Johnson posted via Twitter saying fans wearing original jerseys to the matches from the previous Manchester Storm team would be rewarded with something to take home. On the same day it was made public that the newly-formed Storm had signed their first two players: Team GB defenceman Dave Phillips and Matty Davies, who would both play in the coming season.

The Storm competed in their first match on 29 August 2015 in a friendly against the Nottingham Panthers. The Manchester side led by then GM, Neil Russell, previously with the Belfast Giants, came away victors with a 5–4 win after a penalty shootout with the first goal scored by the newly-formed side coming from forward Vinny Scarsella. Despite the side taking a win, behind the scenes the Storm had yet to recruit a full team and were plagued with other issues such as waiting on signed imports to arrive in the UK as well as visas to be approved.

The following evening the Storm played away in another friendly against the 2014–15 EPIHL champions the Peterborough Phantoms. The Storm won again with a 7–3 victory with four goals coming from Manchester Storm forward Vinny Scarsella.

The first competitive league match took place on Saturday 5 September 2015. The Storm hosted Scottish side the Edinburgh Capitals. The game ended with the Storm winning 8–1 including a hat-trick by Luke Salazar.

On Sunday 7 February 2016, the Storm set a league record in an away league match against the Edinburgh Capitals. The game ended in a 13–9 win for the Manchester side making it the highest scoring league game on record.

During the course of the season several players such as Gal Koren, Jamie Chilcott and Matt Caria departed from Manchester due to varying reasons. This, however, led to the signings of players such as Devin DiDiomete, locally-born Paul Swindlehurst and Derek Roehl who would all help bring a different dynamic to the team as opposed to player-coach Omar Pacha's idea of a squad built on speed. The Storm narrowly missed out on making the 2015–2016 playoffs finishing 9th in the league above last-placed Edinburgh Capitals.

Second season (2016–17) 
The Manchester-side announced two signings following the end of the regular season: player-coach Omar Pacha re-signed for the following 2016–17 season and Team GB newcomer Jack Prince would also help add to the side coming straight from a four-year-stint of NCAA ice hockey for the University of Alabama–Huntsville. Returning players included defensemen Paul Phillips and Paul Swindlehurst along with forward Patrik Valcak.

The club made the play-offs for the first time since their formation finishing in 8th but coach Omar Pacha would leave at the end of the 2016–17 season, later replacing Marc Lefebvre as Dundee Stars head coach in July 2017. Following Pacha in leaving the club in the summer of 2017 were Adam Harding and Taylor Dickin, who both joined the Dundee Stars – though both moved to Tayside before Pacha was appointed coach.

Elsewhere, Mark Heatley also left soon after the season's end, while Cody Cartier moved to the Ligue Magnus to sign for Gap. Fellow forward Mario Valery-Trabucco also headed to France to sign for Ligue Magnus side Gothiques d'Amiens.

Following Trabucco out of the Storm Shelter was American defenceman Paul Phillips who moved to Milton Keynes Lightning after two years in Manchester, while forward Jack Prince announced his retirement after a season with the Storm. Fellow defenceman Connor Varley also moved to France to sign for Gamyo d'Épinal.

Third season (2017–18) 
The club parted company with player/coach Omar Pacha after two years in the role. Following a takeover by a group led by businessmen Jamie Tunstall and Gordon Greig, the club appointed Ryan Finnerty as their new coach in May 2017. Finnerty had departed Braehead Clan at the end of the 2016/17 season and had previously coached the Sheffield Steelers.

His first act was to sign former NHLer Jay Rosehill who followed Finnerty to Manchester from Braehead. The signings continued as defenceman Dallas Ehrhardt and netminder Mike Clemente committed for a second season, before news that the Storm had signed former NHL forward Dane Byers and a former Colorado Avalanche draft pick in forward Luke Moffatt. Recruitment continued with the signing of young English defenceman Declan Balmer and forward Ciaran Long, both from Basingstoke Bison in June 2017.

Ahead of the 2017–18 season, the club confirmed a partnership with Hull Pirates to enable U23 players from the Pirates to step up to Elite League level on two-way contracts. The first player to sign was goaltender Ashley Smith who arrived as the back-up to Mike Clemente on 21 June 2017.

Finnerty continued his recruitment drive by re-signing centre Matt Bissonnette for a second season and then by capturing Canadian forward Mike Hammond from Braehead Clan on 26 June 2017. Then, on 30 June 2017, Manchester strengthened their defensive corps with the arrival of American defenceman Ryan Trenz from ECHL side Alaska Aces, while Swedish winger Gerard Hanson arrived from Northern Michigan University.

On 14 July 2017, Storm coach Finnerty completed the signing of what he termed his "top target" in capturing Matt Beca from his former side Braehead Clan. Beca joined former Clan teammates Rosehill and Hammond at the Storm Shelter after putting up 83 points in 62 league and cup games during the 2016/17 season.

Five days later, the Storm made their 15th signing ahead of the new season with the arrival of 29-year-old Canadian centre Chris Auger from ECHL side Brampton Beast. Auger had first come to the attention of Finnerty while playing a solitary season (2014–15) with the Fife Flyers. On 24 July 2017, the forward lines were completed with the acquisition of 29-year-old Canadian centre Shane Bakker from the Atlanta Gladiators of the ECHL.

The Storm added to their defensive unit with the acquisition of 27-year-old Canadian Matt Stanisz from ECHL side Elmira Jackals on 7 August 2017. On 9 August 2017, the Storm added fellow Canadian defenceman, 22-year-old Linden Springer from Lakehead University.

On 11 August 2017, Manchester completed their roster with the signing of 28-year-old Canadian defenceman/centre Nate Fleming. Despite Fleming sitting out the 2016/17 season, Storm coach Finnerty was pleased to sign the former Edinburgh Capitals defenceman.

After an injury to centre Chris Auger that ruled the Canadian out of action for the foreseeable future in October 2017, Finnerty snapped up Canadian centre Scott Pitt from MsHK Zilina, reuniting him with his former coach and three former Braehead Clan teammates. Pitt had played under Finnerty at Braehead for three seasons.

The first game of the season saw Storm lose on the road to Finnerty's formed club, before they got their revenge in the return fixture the following night. From there, things continued to build for Storm and for the first two months of the season remained in the top three places in the league. Whilst the club's fortunes in the Challenge Cup didn't favour as well as those in the league, the momentum was building.

Storm suffered a few defeats throughout December and January and with other teams catching up with fixtures saw themselves slowly drop down the table to seventh place, however the Storm's home record continued to do the club proud.

The end of January saw Storm start a run of ten games unbeaten, including the first league win against the Sheffield Steelers since reforming, which helped to move the club back up the table. On 18 February, with over a month of the regular season remaining, Storm clinched their spot in the playoffs.

As the results began to mount in Storm's favour, so did the attendances. By the end of the season Storm had sold out more games than the previous two seasons combined, including the final five games of the season. Storm ended the season in the runners up position, behind the Cardiff Devils who retained their title, and winners of the newly created Patton Conference.

The playoffs were a disappointment, with a stunning 4-1 victory away at the Fife Flyers followed by a disappointing 1-4 home defeat the following evening, with the Flyers securing the victory in overtime.

Fourth season (2018–19) 
After so much success in the previous season, it was a difficult year for the Storm, starting in the summer with the departures of some of the key members of the squad. Matt Beca and Scott Pitt returned to Glasgow, while Matt Stanisz and Gerard Hanson followed them, and Paul Swindlehurst departed to join the Belfast Giants. One of the biggest losses came after netminder Mike Clemente retired after two seasons. Clemente was a fan favourite and proved to be one of the best goaltenders in the league. Matt Ginn did a stellar job coming into the squad to replace him, ending the year with a 90.9% save percentage, the fourth most among regular goaltenders across the league.

In just his second year in the league, British forward Ciaran Long had one of the greatest recent seasons of any domestic player in the league. Following up his debut season where he posted 35 points, Long almost doubled his production, ending the year with 60 points in as many games.

While the team may have been towards the bottom of the standings, Mike Hammond was again Manchester's best player, with a league leading 57 assists alongside 18 goals. Captain Dane Byers put in a true "lead by example" season, leading the team with 29 goals while also racking up a league high 182 penalty minutes.

Things didn't get off to the best start, with Storm picking up just four wins in their opening ten games, and these struggles continued throughout the campaign. At the turn of the New Year there was some hope as the Storm looked to mount a climb up the table, picking up five straight wins in January, but a string of up and down performances for the rest of the campaign saw them as the final team eliminated from playoff contention in the final weekend of the regular season, despite having the third best home ice record in the league.

Penalty trouble saw the Storm suffer, with four players ending the year with over 100 penalty minutes as Harrison Ruopp, Shane Bakker, Linden Springer and Dane Byers combined for just shy of 600 penalty minutes.

Recent years (2019–)
The Covid-19 pandemic saw the 2019–20 EIHL season brought to a premature close in 2020, with only the Challenge Cup seeing a winner crowned, following Sheffield's victory over Cardiff in the final.

The 2020–21 EIHL season was cancelled completely due to ongoing social distancing restrictions related to the Covid-19 pandemic, but Manchester were named as one of four English EIHL sides taking part in the 2021 'Elite Series' between April and May 2021.

The 2021–22 EIHL season went ahead as scheduled, with the Belfast Giants winning their fifth league title. Manchester missed the play-offs following a 9th place finish. In April 2022 following the conclusion of the season, head coach Ryan Finnerty stood down after five years in charge to focus solely on his responsibilities as General Manager.

In May 2022, Manchester confirmed the appointment of Matt Ginn as the team's head coach on a two-year deal beginning from the 2022–23 Elite League season. Ginn, the Storm's former starting netminder, retired from playing to take up the role having also served as an assistant coach to Ryan Finnerty, becoming the third coach in franchise history.

On 1 January 2023, Manchester Storm announced automation company Robiquity had signed on as title partners through to the end of the 2024–25 season.

Season-by-season records

† Note: the 2019–20 season was cancelled due to the COVID-19 coronavirus. The table shows the standings at the point of cancellation. No champion was crowned and the play-offs were also cancelled.

†† Note: the 2020–21 Elite League season - originally scheduled for a revised start date of 5 December - was suspended on 15 September 2020, because of ongoing coronavirus pandemic restrictions. The EIHL board determined that the season was non-viable without supporters being permitted to attend matches and unanimously agreed to a suspension. The season was cancelled completely in February 2021. Manchester were later announced as one of four Elite League teams taking part in the 'Elite Series' between April–May 2021, a total of 24 games culminating in a best-of-three play-off final series.

Honours

EIHL Patton Conference champions
2017–18

Individual
EIHL All-Stars

First Team Elite Prospects - Award - EIHL All-Star First Team
2017–18: Mike Hammond
Second Team Elite Prospects - Award - EIHL All-Star Second Team
2015–16: Paul Phillips, Mathew Sisca
2017–18: Luke Moffatt
2019–20: Matt Ginn

Current squad 
Squad for 2022-23 Elite League season 

* Denotes two-way deal with Bristol Pitbulls
** Denotes two-way deal with Hull Seahawks
*** Denotes two-way deal with Blackburn Hawks

Retired numbers
The club has retired three shirt numbers. Brad Rubachuk's number 41 was originally retired in September 1999, and the honour was repeated, following the relaunch of the team, in February 2017. This was followed by Mike Morin's number 15 which was retired in November 2017. In addition, the club announced in May 2018 that it would be retiring the number 22 shirt in honour of the victims of the Manchester Arena bombing.

Notable former players

References

External links
 Official website of the Manchester Storm

Sport in Manchester
Ice hockey teams in England